Phaea giesberti is a species of beetle in the family Cerambycidae. It was described by Chemsak in 1999. It is known from Panama and Guatemala.

References

giesberti
Beetles described in 1999